Hybris (Swedish:  'hubris') is the first studio album by Swedish progressive rock group Änglagård.

Released in late 1992, it would become one of the most influential albums of the new wave of progressive rock in the 1990s. It begins with "" (which means 'earth-smoke'), the only fully instrumental piece on the album.

The music is quite similar to 1970s progressive rock groups such as Yes, Cathedral and King Crimson, but Änglagård has also created their own style, thanks to Holmgren's folklore-sounding flute playing and Olsson's highly distinctive drumming (he was only 17 in 1992). There are also obvious similarities to the obscure 1970s band Cathedral's one-shot album Stained Glass Stories. Keyboardist Pär Lindh makes an uncredited guest appearance on the album.

The remastered CD version of the album contains a bonus track called "", which seems to be a demo of the song "" from their second album, Epilog. The song was originally included on the Ptolemac Terrascope Number 5 CD sampler. The song also appears on the Hurricane Katrina benefit album After the Storm (NEARfest Records, 2005).

Track listing
All music written and arranged by Änglagård. All lyrics by Tord Lindman.
"" ('Earth Smoke') – 11:10
"" ('Wanderings in Confusion') – 11:56
"" ('From Clarity to Clarity') – 8:08
"" ('King Winter') – 13:04
"" ('Marching Tune from Knapptibble') (bonus track) – 7:19

Personnel
 Tord Lindman: Vocals, Gibson 335, nylon and steel acoustic guitars
 Jonas Engdegård: Stratocaster, Gibson 335, nylon and steel acoustic guitars
 Thomas Johnson: Mellotron, Hammond Organ B-3 & L-100, Solina, clavinet, pianet, Korg Mono/Poly, piano and church organ
 Anna Holmgren: Flute
 Johan Högberg: Rickenbacker bass, bass pedals and Mellotron effects
 Mattias Olsson: Sonor drumset, Zildjian cymbals, concert bass drum, triangles, tambourines, vibraslap, Po-Chung, gong, castanets, line bells, cowbell, wood block, glockenspiel, tubular bells, bongos, bells, ice-bell, finger cymbals, waterfall, agogô bells, cabasa, claves, French cowbell, African drums and effect-flute
 Pär Lindh (uncredited): guest keyboardist

Production
Produced and mixed by Änglagård and Roger Skogh
Engineered by Roger Skogh

Reception
In February 2018, Hybris was ranked twentieth on the Prog Archives Top Studio Albums of All-Time. It is additionally the highest-ranked album of the entire 1990s on this list and the third-highest album released after the 1970s (after Wobbler's From Silence to Somewhere [2017], at #15 overall, and Rush's Moving Pictures [1981], at #16).

References

Änglagård albums
1992 debut albums